Choi Sang-Ok (최상옥, 崔尙玉, 1928 ~ 2015) was the founder of Korean restaurant YongSuSan, the first restaurant in South Korea to adopt western styles of service (dining, waiting staff, etc.) with Korean food. She was born and raised in Kaesung. 

Her restaurant was named after a mountain in Kaesung, capital of the ancient Koryo Dynasty and specializes in Kaesung-style and Korean royal court cuisine.

References

External links 

 Official page of Lose Angeles location

1928 births
2015 deaths